Gondi is a 2020 Bangladeshi romantic comedy-drama film. The film was directed by Fakhrul Arefeen Khan and produced by Gorai Films. It stars Sabyasachi Chakrabarty and Suborna Mustafa, with Shuvashish Bhowmik, Majnun Mijan, Aparna Ghosh, Aman Reza and Payel Mukherjee in supporting roles.

Plot 
A 60-year-old retired government official and widower, Mr. Azgar Ali, lives alone with his driver and working people in an elite area of Dhaka. His only son, Ali Mizan, lives in London with his family. After two years, Ali Mizan comes home to see his father. Azgar Ali is suffering from dementia and memory loss. His daily routine is gardening on the roof, watching stars at night, walking in the park in the morning and talking on Skype with his granddaughter Arha in London. Due to his poor memory, Azgar Ali makes many mistakes every day. One such mistake is to transfer rupees 5 lakh to Mrs Shamima's account by mistake. Mrs. Shamima, who is in her 50s and also lonely, is a dentist by profession and is the neighbor of Azgar Ali. Her only daughter lives in London with her husband Jason. Azgar Ali and Mrs. Shamima get acquainted after the accidental money transfer, and they become friends. Azgar Ali's doctor advises the two to go to Cox's Bazar. Azgar Ali's son and his daughter-in-law Millie and Mrs. Shamima's daughter learn about their outing. Within three days, the son, daughter-in-law, and daughter of Shamima arrive from London. The emotional battle of parents and children starts with Azgar Ali and Mrs. Shamima.

Cast

Production 
The film was produced by Gorai Films. Gondi was filmed in various locations including London, England, and with the Bangladesh Film Development Corporation in Uttara, Gulshan, Dhaka, Bangladesh.

References 

2020 films
Bengali-language Bangladeshi films
2020 romantic comedy-drama films
2020s Bengali-language films
Bangladeshi romantic comedy-drama films
Films scored by Debojyoti Mishra
Films directed by Fakhrul Arefeen Khan
Films shot in Dhaka